Sergen Piçinciol (born 11 October 1995) is a Turkish footballer who plays as a centre-back for Bandırmaspor.

Career
Piçinciol began his career in the TFF Second League with Altay, and followed that up with stints at Yeni Malatyaspor, Bergama Belediyespor, Çanakkale Dardanelspor, and Nazilli Belediyespor. He transferred to Giresunspor in the summer of 2020. He helped the team get promoted into the Süper Lig for the first time since 1977. He made his professional debut with Giresunspor in a 1–0 Süper Lig win over Yeni Malatyaspor on 20 November 2021.

On 29 January 2023, Piçinciol signed a 2.5-year contract with Bandırmaspor.

References

External links
 
 

1995 births
Living people
Sportspeople from Kars
Turkish footballers
Association football defenders
Altay S.K. footballers
Yeni Malatyaspor footballers
Dardanelspor footballers
Nazilli Belediyespor footballers
Giresunspor footballers
Bandırmaspor footballers
Süper Lig players
TFF First League players
TFF Second League players
TFF Third League players